Bab Laassal is one of the gates of the medina of Tunis.

This gate was created during the Ottoman period at the same time as Bab Sidi Kacem, Bab Sidi Abdessalem and Bab El Gorjani.

There is the El Borj Mosque, also known as the Sidi Yahia Mosque.

References

Laassal